Spirigera concentrica is an extinct species of brachiopods.

References 

Prehistoric brachiopods
Rhynchonellata